Blake construction is a method of making shoes invented  in 1856 by Lyman Reed Blake.

It is especially popular in Italy.  In a Blake construction,  the outer sole is directly stitched  to the insole with a chain stitch this allows more flexibility and  lighter weight as compared to the sturdier Goodyear construction.

References

Footwear
Shoes